Louis-Eustache Ude, (ca 1768 – 10 April 1846), chef and writer, was the best-known French chef in London before Alexis Soyer, and the author of an influential cookery book, The French Cook, first published in 1813 with thirteen new editions following over the next three decades. 

After leaving an apprenticeship in the kitchens of the French royal palace at Versailles, Ude is thought to have tried numerous other occupations before returning to cooking and rising to the top of the profession. Most of his career was in England, where he is credited with introducing haute cuisine to the country. He cooked in the kitchens of the British aristocracy, royalty and clubland.

Life and career

Early years
Ude was born in about 1768. Little is known for certain about his early years. In a biographical sketch written in 1835 Abraham Hayward stated that Ude's mother was a milliner, who married a member of the kitchen staff at the Palace of Versailles. According to this account Ude joined his father in the royal kitchens (he later described himself as "former cook to Louis XVI") but left to become apprenticed to, successively, a cheap jeweller, an engraver, a printer and a haberdasher, after which he became traveller for a merchant in Lyon. After returning to Paris he was for a short while an actor in a small theatre, and then worked unsuccessfully in finance and the civil service.
By some accounts Ude fled France during the Reign of Terror. According to Hayward, and to Joseph Favre in the Dictionnaire universel de cuisine (1892), he remained in France throughout the revolution, returned to cooking and rose to become chef d'hôtel for Letitia Bonaparte, the mother of Napoleon. Hayward wrote:

England
Ude's history after he moved to England is more consistently attested, although precise dates are mostly lacking. Despite the impression conveyed by Favre that a French chef in London was something new, Ude was in fact following a centuries-old tradition of French cooks working for the rich and powerful of London. He became chef to William Molyneux, 2nd Earl of Sefton, of Arlington Street off Piccadilly and Croxteth Hall in Lancashire. Favre describes Sefton as "this wealthy lord, who was known as the king of English Epicureans". Sefton paid Ude well: his salary was £300 a year, according to Hayward. When Sefton died in 1838 he left Ude an annuity of £100, though the chef had not by then worked for him for more than twenty years. 

While working for Sefton, Ude published the first edition of The French Cook, in 1813. Favre calls it the first cookery book to be published in London, which, as the Oxford Dictionary of National Biography (ODNB) observes, is untrue, but the ODNB finds some truth in Favre's statement that Ude was among the first to popularise haute cuisine in England. The book was a considerable success and went through fourteen editions over the next three decades, making the author a large amount of money. By the time of his death it was regarded as "the standard work in the science of cookery". Its fame spread beyond kitchens. Lord Byron drew on it extensively for a description of a banquet in Don Juan.

Between the publication of the third edition of the book, in 1815, and that of the fourth, in 1816, Ude left Sefton's employment. (There is a story that he resigned because a guest added more pepper to his soup.) After leaving Sefton, Ude became steward to the United Service Club, where "his dinners were acknowledged to be better than any other Club could boast", according to the historian Arthur Humphreys. By the time of the fifth edition of The French Cook (1818) Ude had left the club. In 1821 he married (Camille) Barbe Lucot at St George's, Hanover Square.

At some point between 1818 and 1826 Ude became steward to Frederick Augustus, Duke of York, George III's second son. Following the death of the duke in 1827 Ude became chef at Crockford's gambling club. The Standard reported on 25 October 1827:

£1,200 a year was an enormous sum in the 1820s – the equivalent of more than £1m in terms of 2020 incomes – although from it Ude had to pay all his assistant chefs and kitchen staff. The ODNB comments, "At a time when club food consisted chiefly of boiled fowl, mutton, and roast beef, Ude's more refined cooking put Crockford's on the culinary map". Thomas Crofton Croker wrote in 1829 of "the classic Cuisine of Ude ... Ude's fame is boundless as is his talent. Does not London resound ... with the celebrity of this Professor of the culinary art?" The London Review praised Ude's banquets as "quasi-Elysian". The ODNB gives examples of Ude's famous creations: "an entrée of soft roes of mackerel baked in butter and served with a cream sauce" and "a most delicious sweet made with fresh stoned cherries, and which he christened Boudin de cerises à la Bentinck".

Later years
In 1838 Ude parted company with the club. Benjamin Disraeli wrote to his sister, "There has been a row at Crockford's, and Ude dismissed. He told the committee he was worth £4,000 a year. Their new man is quite a failure, so I think the great artist may yet return from Elba." The new man, Charles Elmé Francatelli, was in fact a success, and Ude did not return. In retirement he was financially well off, but bored and miserable. A friend asked him why he did not busy himself in his own kitchen, but he replied, "Bah! I have not been into my kitchen once: I hate the sight of my kitchen. I dine on roast mutton dressed by a cookmaid". He was indignant about his treatment by Crockford's but admitted, "Ah, I love that Club, though they are ingrats".

Among Ude's friends in his later years was his successor as London's most famous French chef, Alexis Soyer, whom Ude liked as a man and approved of as a chef. At Soyer's wedding in 1837, Ude was one of the two witnesses. He continued to live in London until his death of fever at his house in Albemarle Street on 10 April 1846 at an age variously reported as 76, 77 and 78. After a Solemn mass at the French chapel in Little George Street he was buried in Kensal Green cemetery. His widow lived until 1862.

The French Cook
The contents of the book varied from edition to edition. In the first (1813), Ude contends in a brief introduction that "The works hitherto published on the Art of Cookery are unintelligible, and the receipts therein indicated impracticable". He makes it clear from the outset that he is writing about grand cuisine. An example he gives of a typical dinner menu consists of:

The above is one of the simplest of his menus.

Ude took care with his prose, and either coined or popularised the maxim Coquus nascitur non fit— "cooks are born, not made". In The French Cook he observed, "It is very remarkable that in France, where there is but one religion, the sauces are infinitely varied, whilst in England, where the different sects are innumerable, there is, we may say, but one single sauce". To Ude, sauces were "the soul of cookery". 

Although Ude considered that when English cooking was done well it was unsurpassable, he deplored some aspects of the English attitude to dining. He condemned the unremitting hostility of England's doctors to good eating, and the indifference of its women to haute cuisine:

E. Cobham Brewer, calling Ude "the most learned of cooks", attributed to him the authorship of a book called La Science de Gueule ("The Science of the Mouth"). No such book is listed in WorldCat or mentioned in the ODNB or obituaries of Ude.

Notes, references and sources

Notes

References

Sources

English chefs
French chefs